Crown Group Holdings is a property group that deals with the development and investment of properties in Australia. It was co-founded in 1996 by Iwan Sunito and Paul Sathio. The group is headquartered at Sydney, Australia and has branches in Indonesia.

The company was awarded NSW President's award and Best Concept Design by the Urban Development Institute of Australia.

The company had about a 4000-unit pipeline of Sydney projects.

History 
The company was co-founded by architect Iwan Sunito and engineer Paul Sathio in 1996.

In 1994 Iwan Sunito established his own architecture firm, Joshua International Architects which was in 1996 amalgamated with two business partners, including current Chief Executive Officer Paul Sathio, to form Crown Group.

Properties 

Crown Group has completed residential developments in locations across Sydney including Green Square, Waterloo, Sydney, North Sydney, Ryde, Bondi, Bondi Junction, Parramatta, Ashfield, Epping, Homebush, Newington, Pennant Hills and Rhodes.

The group's first development in 1996 ‘The Crown’ at Bondi Junction was a 54-unit development at Bondi Junction.

Crown Group has recently completed projects in Sydney: V by Crown Group, a 29-storey residential tower in Parramatta; Arc by Crown Group, a 25-storey tower in Sydney CBD on Clarence Street; and Skye by Crown Group, a 20-storey development in North Sydney.

In 2019, they completed two developments. The first was Infinity by Crown Group, designed by Koichi Takada Architects, which is part of the urban renewal in the Green Square town centre in Sydney and has become an architectural icon in Sydney since its completion. By 2030, City of Sydney expects Green Square to attract 40,000 new residents and 22,000 new workers.

The SJB-designed development Waterfall by Crown Group in nearby Waterloo was also finished in late 2019.

In 2020, Crown Group is expanding into the Brisbane and Melbourne property markets. Melbourne's housing market is set to eclipse Sydney's in 2020 fuelled by a stronger economy and higher population growth.  It is also expanding into Los Angeles, USA, with a proposed residential tower in Downtown, designed by Koichi Takada Architects.

There are two new mixed-use residential communities under development in Sydney.

Mastery by Crown Group is being developed in partnership with Mitsubishi Estate Asia at Waterloo. The residential, retail and dining precinct has a Japanese design aesthetic and theme. One building is designed by Japanese architect Kengo Kuma and the other four buildings by Sydney firms Koichi Takada Architects and Sylvester Fuller.

Construction is underway on Eastlakes Live by Crown Group in Sydney’s inner-south.

Designed by internationally acclaimed architects Francis-Jones Morehen Thorp (fjmt), the new Eastlakes precinct will have more than 400 apartments planned and a new shopping centre and dining precinct. Construction began in October 2018 on stage one and is expected to be completed in early 2021.

Hotels 
Crown Group's boutique hotel chain, SKYE Suites, currently has two hotels in operation; SKYE Suites Parramatta and SKYE Suites Sydney CBD. 

In mid-2020 the company will open a third 90-room hotel within their development Infinity by Crown Group called SKYE Suites Green Square.

References 

Companies based in Sydney
Holding companies of Australia
Companies established in 1996
1996 establishments in Australia